Aladin is a village in the Zangilan District of Azerbaijan.

History
The village was located in the Armenian-occupied territories surrounding Nagorno-Karabakh, coming under the control of ethnic Armenian forces in 1993 during the First Nagorno-Karabakh War.

The village subsequently became part of the self-proclaimed Republic of Artsakh as part of its Kashatagh Province, referred to as Vanatun.

It was recaptured by Azerbaijan on 30 October 2020, during the Aras Valley campaign in the 2020 Nagorno-Karabakh war.

References 

Populated places in Zangilan District